Corjova may refer to several places in Moldova:

Corjova, Criuleni, a commune in Criuleni district
Corjova, Dubăsari, a commune in Dubăsari district